Senatorial elections were held on 27 September 2020 to pick 172 of the 348 seats in the Senate of the French Fifth Republic. The elections were a modest victory for the centre-right Republicans. The environmentalist Europe Ecology – The Greens party entered the upper chamber, while Emmanuel Macron's centrist La République En Marche! party maintained their position, despite losses in the 2020 French municipal elections earlier in the year. The far-right National Rally kept their one seat, and the Corsican nationalists gained their first seat as well.

Elected senators

References 

Senate (France) elections
2020 elections in France
September 2020 events in France